UNICEF Philippines is one of over 190 country offices of the United Nations Children’s Fund (UNICEF). One of the first UNICEF offices established in Asia, it works to uphold the rights of children in the Philippines, including their right to education, healthcare and protection from abuse and exploitation. It also advocates for political change in support of children, and works with partners from the public and private sectors to create change through sustainable programs.

UNICEF was created in 1946 to provide food, clothing and healthcare to children in Europe after the Second World War. In 1953, the UN General Assembly extended UNICEF’s mandate. and in 1989 it adopted the UN Convention on the Rights of the Child (CRC), which has since become the most widely adopted human rights treaty in history. The CRC now underpins UNICEF’s work around the world, including in the Philippines, and defines children’s rights.

Programs

Child protection 
UNICEF works to provide a safe and protective environment for vulnerable children, including victims of abuse, exploitation and violence. UNICEF develops and strengthens child protection networks at the community, local and national levels. The organization also supports the establishment of Child Protection Units and specialized courts to help victims of child exploitation and abuse. In the Philippines, UNICEF has lobbied successfully for the passage of several major laws to protect children’s rights, including the Juvenile Justice and Welfare Act and the Anti-Child Pornography Act of 2009.

Disaster risk reduction 
UNICEF's disaster risk reduction (DRR) program aims to establish models of child-centered disaster risk management for eventual replication by local government units (LGU), as a basis for integrating DRR in their local development plans. Aside from bridging the gap between community-based activities and public policy, UNICEF also facilitates the partnership of non-government organizations with LGUs to adopt child-sensitive and child-centered DRR and climate change adaptation plans and programs.

Education 
UNICEF works to achieve quality and inclusive education for all children in the Philippines. UNICEF supports the Philippine Government’s thrust to expand access to quality Early Childhood Care and Development (ECCD), which includes universal Kindergarten. UNICEF's education program aims to provide an equitable platform for learning to ensure that young children are ready to learn and enter school at the right age, and that marginalized and excluded children participate in and complete quality elementary education.

Health and nutrition 
UNICEF's health program supports the Philippine Government’s Universal Health Care Agenda and poverty reduction initiatives to serve the poorest families and most vulnerable groups, particularly women and their newborn babies and beneficiaries of the conditional cash transfer program. In line with UNICEF’s equity focus on regions identified by the government as the most disadvantaged, the organization's programs are being implemented in areas that have the lowest number and coverage of health facilities and skilled birth attendants, while supporting the institutionalization of standards to improve the quality of healthcare services for mothers and children at the national level.

UNICEF's nutrition program aims to improve child survival, growth and development through life-cycle nutrition security interventions. UNICEF's nutrition programs in the Philippines include: increasing access among pregnant and lactating women and children under 5 years old to interventions that prevent under-nutrition and micro-nutrient deficiencies; treatment of acute malnutrition; sustaining positive nutrition behavior in vulnerable local government units; and supports the government in promoting breastfeeding and Infant and Young Child Feeding practices.

HIV and AIDS 
UNICEF is supporting the Philippine government's HIV response by gathering data and strategic information, advocating for laws that are responsive to the needs of children and young people, providing life skills and leadership training to adolescents, and helping the government, NGOs and youth networks improve service delivery to respond to the crisis.

Social policy 
UNICEF provides technical assistance to the Philippine government in expanding social protection programs that help children and families who do not receive basic social services, such as street families, indigenous people and migrant families.

Water, sanitation and hygiene (WASH) 
UNICEF aims to achieve universal use and access to sustainable and resilient basic sanitation and safe water with improved hygiene behavior in disadvantaged households, schools and Early Childhood Care and Development  centers in the Philippines. The organization's WASH program focuses on the poorest villages with the lowest WASH coverage, and scaling up interventions to support government programs that address WASH issues at the national level.

Emergency response 
UNICEF is able to respond rapidly to a natural disaster or humanitarian emergency upon the request of the Philippine government. UNICEF's emergency response programs provide support to the government-led response in the areas of child protection, education, health, nutrition, and WASH. Recently, UNICEF has provided assistance to those affected by the Marawi crisis, Typhoon Nock-Ten, Typhoon Haima, Typhoon Melor, Typhoon Koppu, Typhoon Hagupit, Typhoon Haiyan and the Zamboanga City crisis.

Celebrity ambassadors

UNICEF Philippines has appointed two National Goodwill Ambassador: Gary Valenciano and Anne Curtis.

In 1998, UNICEF conferred on musician Gary Valenciano the title of UNICEF National Ambassador, the first in the Philippines. As National Ambassador, he helps increase awareness about the issues that affect children in the Philippines and their rights to education, health, protection, participation, and assistance during emergencies.

Actress, television host and recording artist Anne Curtis was appointed UNICEF Celebrity Advocate for Children in 2014. Her work for UNICEF focuses on promoting Early Childhood Care & Development.

References

External links
UNICEF Philippines
UNICEF global website

UNICEF
Child-related organizations in the Philippines
Organizations based in Manila